Wöllersdorf-Steinabrückl is a municipality in the district of Wiener Neustadt-Land in the Austrian state of Lower Austria.

History

The old ordnance factory in the municipality was used as a concentration camp from 1933 until 1938.

Population

References

Cities and towns in Wiener Neustadt-Land District